Cryptolabis is a genus of crane fly in the family Limoniidae.

Species
Subgenus Cryptolabis Osten Sacken, 1860

C. alticola Alexander, 1944
C. atmophora Alexander, 1929
C. aviformis Alexander, 1979
C. bidenticulata Alexander, 1949
C. bisinuatis Doane, 1900
C. brachyphallus Alexander, 1950
C. chilota Alexander, 1929
C. chiriquiana Alexander, 1969
C. clausula Alexander, 1969
C. cortesi Alexander, 1952
C. diversipes Alexander, 1939
C. ecalcarata Alexander, 1947
C. fuscovenosa Alexander, 1928
C. hilaris Alexander, 1945
C. invaripes Alexander, 1939
C. jovialis Alexander, 1945
C. jubilata Alexander, 1943
C. laddeyi Alexander, 1943
C. laticostata Alexander, 1940
C. longiradialis Alexander, 1939
C. luteiceps Alexander, 1927
C. luteicosta Alexander, 1934
C. luteola Alexander, 1946
C. magnistyla Alexander, 1962
C. minutula Alexander, 1927
C. mixta Alexander, 1949
C. molophiloides Alexander, 1943
C. monacantha Alexander, 1943
C. nebulicincta Alexander, 1941
C. pachyphallus Alexander, 1943
C. pallidivena Alexander, 1969
C. paradoxa Osten Sacken, 1860
C. parrai Alexander, 1946
C. penai Alexander, 1971
C. pendulifera Alexander, 1949
C. perdistans Alexander, 1967
C. phallostena Alexander, 1968
C. recurvata Alexander, 1942
C. retrorsa Alexander, 1950
C. roundsi Alexander, 1939
C. schadei Alexander, 1935
C. semiflava Alexander, 1949
C. sepulchralis Alexander, 1922
C. sica Alexander, 1946
C. sordidipes Alexander, 1943
C. spatulata Alexander, 1929
C. taciturna Alexander, 1945
C. tenuicincta Alexander, 1921
C. travassosi Alexander, 1945
C. tridenticulata Alexander, 1967
C. tropicalis Alexander, 1913
C. umbrosa Alexander, 1938
C. uniformis Alexander, 1969
C. vallicola Alexander, 1947
C. varipes Alexander, 1939

Subgenus Procryptolabis Alexander, 1923
C. argentinensis Alexander, 1923
C. barilochensis Alexander, 1929
C. nigrita Alexander, 1969
C. pedanophallus Alexander, 1969

References

Limoniidae
Nematocera genera